"Dance Go (Eau de Vie)" is a theme song recorded by Nigerian singers Wizkid and 2Face Idibia. The song premiered on the Beat 99.9 FM and was released to promote the Hennessy brand in Nigeria.

Promotion and music video
To promote their brand, Hennessy launched the "Hennessy Artistry African Tour", a one-night only event held in several parts of Nigeria, Johannesburg and Accra. The event featured live performances from WizKid, 2face Idibia, Patoranking, Mafikizolo and MzVee.

The music video for "Dance Go (Eau de Vie)" was shot in Nigeria by Kemi Adetiba. It was released through the video sharing website YouTube on 5 February 2015.

Track listing
 Digital single

References

External links

2014 songs
2014 singles
Wizkid songs
Song recordings produced by Sarz
Songs written by Wizkid